The Jungbu Naeryuk Expressway Branch() is an expressway in South Korea, connecting Dalseong to Buk District, Daegu (30 km).  It is numbered 451.

Former name is Guma Expressway.(구마고속도로)

Originally, this route was called Daegu ~ Masan Section(86.4 km). but in Reform of Korea Expressway route at August 2001, Masan ~ Hyeonpung JCT section was incorporated into Jungbu Naeryuk Expressway.

In 2008, this route changed name to Jungbu Naeryuk Expressway Branch

Information

Lanes 
 Hyeonpung ~ Okpo : 4 Lanes
 South Daegu ~ West Daegu : 6 Lanes
 Hwawon Okpo ~ South Daegu, West Daegu ~ Geumho : 8 Lanes
 Okpo ~ Hwawon Okpo : 10 Lanes

Lengths 
 30.0 km

Speed limit 
 100 km/h

List of facilities 

 IC: Interchange, JC: Junction, SA: Service Area, TG:Tollgate

See also
 Sincheon-daero, Daegu
 Roads and expressways in South Korea
 Transportation in South Korea

External links
 MOLIT South Korean Government Transport Department

Expressways in South Korea
Roads in Daegu

ja:邱馬高速道路